Timothy John Payne (born 10 January 1994) is a New Zealand professional footballer who plays as a defender for Wellington Phoenix in the A-League and for the New Zealand national team.

A noted utility player, Payne has played almost every outfield position during his career.

Career

Auckland City and Waitakere United
Born in Auckland, Payne attended Sacred Heart College and started his youth career with ASB Premiership club Auckland City FC before switching to play for rivals Waitakere United. Payne played a major role in Waitakere United's success in the ASB National Youth League in 2010.

Blackburn Rovers
After impressing at the 2011 FIFA U-17 World Cup Payne trialed with Premier League side Blackburn Rovers and then spent several months training at the club.
Then days after celebrating his 18th birthday Payne signed a two-and-half-year contract with Rovers in January 2012. Due to work permit issues that prevented him from playing for Rovers, he was released at the end of his contract.

Wellington Phoenix
In July 2019, Payne signed a one-year contract with A-League side Wellington Phoenix. On 3 January 2020, it was announced that Payne had signed a two-year contract extension with the Phoenix.  On June 10, Payne pleaded guilty to a drink-driving charge after a shirtless late-night joy ride in a golf cart in Sydney while the team was supposed to be in self-isolation. He was subsequently ordered by the court to pay a AUS$700 fine.

International career
Payne represented New Zealand at Under-17 level. He played 90 minutes in each of his sides four matches at the 2011 FIFA U-17 World Cup in Mexico.

In May 2012 Payne received a call up from Ricki Herbert to the All Whites alongside fellow youngster and U-17 teammate Cameron Howieson. Payne made his first appearance for the senior national team in a 1–0 win against Honduras on 26 May 2012, he came on as a substitute for Leo Bertos and played the final 15 minutes of the match. He subsequently made an appearance off the bench in the OFC Nations Cup 2012. Payne was named in New Zealand football team for the 2012 Olympics.

International goals and caps
New Zealand's goal tally first.

International career statistics

References

External links
 
 Blackburn Rovers profile
 
 NZ Football Profile

1994 births
Living people
Association footballers from Auckland
Association football forwards
New Zealand association footballers
New Zealand expatriate association footballers
New Zealand international footballers
Auckland City FC players
Waitakere United players
Blackburn Rovers F.C. players
Portland Timbers 2 players
Eastern Suburbs AFC players
Wellington Phoenix FC players
Olympic association footballers of New Zealand
2012 OFC Nations Cup players
Footballers at the 2012 Summer Olympics
New Zealand under-20 international footballers
Expatriate footballers in England
Expatriate soccer players in the United States
New Zealand expatriate sportspeople in England
New Zealand expatriate sportspeople in the United States
USL Championship players
New Zealand Football Championship players